Les Trois Chevaux is a fine dining restaurant in New York City. Owned and run by Angie Mar, it opened in July 2021 and serves French cuisine.

Description
The interior was designed by Brenda Bello and Joel Medina, while the staff's uniforms were designed by Christian Siriano. The restaurant's dress code mandates that male diners must wear dinner jackets—a homage to Mar's father, who always wore one when dining out. The main dining room can seat 37 diners, while the bar can accommodate nine more. The menu contains modern French cuisine, with dishes such as frog legs, sweetbreads, foie gras, and pigeon breast. A predominantly French and American wine list is also available.

History
Angie Mar owned and ran The Beatrice Inn in New York City from 2016 till December 2020, when high rent and the COVID-19 pandemic led to the restaurant's closure. Mar initially announced that the restaurant would be reopening right next door at West 12th Street in Greenwich Village and renamed The Beatrice. However, at the start of 2021, she decided to open a completely new restaurant instead, named Les Trois Chevaux or "The Three Horses".

While The Beatrice Inn was a steakhouse, Les Trois Chevaux would not have steak on the menu and would focus on French cuisine instead. According to Mar herself, she had been inspired by "great French restaurants of eras past" including La Côte Basque and Lutèce. The menu was developed in consultation with Jacques Pépin, who also suggested the restaurant's name. Les Trois Chevaux opened on July 8, 2021.

References

2021 establishments in New York City
2020s in Manhattan
French restaurants in New York City
Restaurants in Manhattan
Restaurants established in 2021